Janieve Russell (born 14 November 1993) is a Jamaican track and field athlete who competes mainly in the 400 metres hurdles and the 400 metres sprint. She won an Olympic bronze medal in the 4×400m relay in Tokyo 2021, where she also finished fourth in the 400m hurdles final in a personal best of 53.08 secs. She is a four-time Commonwealth Games gold medallist, winning the 400m hurdles title in 2018 and 2022, and the 4×400m relay in 2014 and 2018. She has also won two relay silvers at the World Championships and a relay gold at the World Indoor Championships.

Russell was highly successful as a youth and junior level athlete. She was a nine-time gold medallist at the CARIFTA Games and a double gold medallist at the 2012 World Junior Championships in Athletics, winning the 400 metres hurdles and the 4 × 400 m relay. She also won a relay medal at the 2010 World Junior Championships in Athletics.

Career

Early life and career
Born in Manchester, Jamaica, she attended Holmwood Technical High School in Christiana and competed in a variety of track and field events while there. She was in the top three of both the high jump and long jump at the Jamaican High School Championships in 2008 and made her international debut shortly after, taking the under-17 long jump silver at the 2008 CARIFTA Games. At the competition she was also the high jump bronze medallist, double gold medallist in the 4×100 and 4×400 metres relays, and set a games record in the 300 metres hurdles as well. She was among the contenders in the long jump at the 2009 World Youth Championships in Athletics, but was twenty centimetres off her best in the final and finished in ninth place.

Expanding her oeuvre, in 2010 Russell placed in the top three at the Jamaican High School in the 100 metres hurdles as well as her long jump speciality. Taking in combined track and field events, she entered the pentathlon at the 2010 CARIFTA Games and won by a margin of nearly 400 points. She still entered the long jump individually, and placed fourth. The Jamaican junior championships saw her win a long jump/400 metres sprint double. International junior medals followed at the 2010 Central American and Caribbean Junior Championships, where the 16-year-old Russell took the 400 m silver medal win a personal best of 53.68 seconds and helped the Jamaican 4×400 metres relay team to the gold medals. She was selected for the same events at the 2010 World Junior Championships in Athletics. Although she was a little slower in the 400 m individual event, being eliminated in the semi-finals, she won a medal with the Jamaican team, which ran its fastest time of the year (3:32.24 minutes) to claim the bronze medals. She competed internationally in her fourth different event of the season, choosing the long jump for the 2010 Youth Olympics and placing seventh in the competition.

The 2011 season saw Russell set personal bests in all the disciplines she competed in, bar the jumps. She focused on the 400 metres hurdles at the start of the year, which culminated in a victory in the under-19 section of the 2011 CARIFTA Games in a personal best of 57.71 seconds. She also won relay gold with the Jamaican team at the competition. In May she ran track bests of 24.10 seconds for the 200 metres and 53.55 seconds for the 400 m. The 2011 Pan American Junior Athletics Championships was the biggest international event of her season and she finished with a heptathlon silver medal behind Brazil's Tamara de Souza, setting bests in the shot put and 100 metres hurdles along the way.

World Junior champion
Russell began to specialise more in the hurdles in 2012. She repeated her hurdles/relay double at the 2012 CARIFTA Games and was also the long jump runner-up. Her season focused on the 2012 World Junior Championships in Athletics. She entered as the world leader in the 400 m hurdles through her new best of 57.04 seconds at the national championships in June. She was dominant at the competition and won the gold medal by a margin of over a second, setting a new best time of 56.62 seconds. This made her the second Jamaican woman to win the title, following in the footsteps of Kaliese Spencer She then anchored the Jamaican 4×400 m relay team to the silver medals behind the American team.

Senior career
Having finished her junior career, she gained an athletic scholarship to study at the University of Technology, Jamaica – an institution with a prominent sports programme. She continued to focus on the 400 m hurdles, setting a new best of 56.30 seconds in 2013, and began training in the event under Stephen Francis at the MVP Track Club. She markedly improved her performances in 2014. She knocked over a second and a half off her 400 m sprint best, running a time of 51.49 seconds in Kingston in June. At the Jamaican Championships she was runner-up i the 400 m hurdles to the Kaliese Spencer, the top Jamaican and training partner. Russell's time of 54.75 seconds was almost a second improvement on her previous best.

She was chosen to compete at the 2014 Commonwealth Games (her first senior selection) and she came away with a bronze medal in the 400 m hurdles, finishing behind Spencer and host nation athlete Eilidh Child. She ran in the heats of the 4×400 m relay and though she was replaced in the final, the team won the gold medals.

Personal bests
400 metres hurdles – 53.08 sec (2021)
200 metres – 23.43 sec (2018)
400 metres – 51.17 sec (2016)
800 metres – 2:11.5h min (2015)
100 metres hurdles – 13.80 sec (2012)
300 metres hurdles – 41.30 sec (2009)
High jump –  (2009)
Long jump –  (2010)
Shot put –  (2011)
Javelin throw –  (2011)
Pentathlon – 3825 points (2010)
Heptathlon – 5361 points (2011)

International competition record

 † = Competed in the heats of the relay only.
1Disqualified in the final

National titles
Heptathlon: 2010
400 meter hurdles: 2015

References

External links

Living people
1993 births
Jamaican female sprinters
Jamaican female hurdlers
Jamaican female long jumpers
Jamaican heptathletes
Commonwealth Games gold medallists for Jamaica
Commonwealth Games bronze medallists for Jamaica
Athletes (track and field) at the 2014 Commonwealth Games
Athletes (track and field) at the 2018 Commonwealth Games
People from Manchester Parish
Athletes (track and field) at the 2010 Summer Youth Olympics
World Athletics Championships athletes for Jamaica
World Athletics Championships medalists
Athletes (track and field) at the 2016 Summer Olympics
Olympic athletes of Jamaica
Commonwealth Games medallists in athletics
IAAF Continental Cup winners
Jamaican Athletics Championships winners
Commonwealth Games gold medallists in athletics
Athletes (track and field) at the 2020 Summer Olympics
Medalists at the 2020 Summer Olympics
Olympic bronze medalists in athletics (track and field)
Olympic bronze medalists for Jamaica
World Athletics Indoor Championships winners
20th-century Jamaican women
21st-century Jamaican women
Medallists at the 2014 Commonwealth Games
Medallists at the 2018 Commonwealth Games